This article shows the rosters of all participating teams at the men's rugby sevens tournament at the 2022 Commonwealth Games in Birmingham.

Pool A

New Zealand

Samoa

England

Sri Lanka

Pool B

South Africa

Scotland

Tonga

Malaysia

Pool C

Fiji

Canada

Wales

Zambia

Pool D

Australia

Kenya

Uganda

Jamaica

References

Commonwealth Games rugby sevens squads